Amadeusz is a Polish-language version of the given name Amadeus. Notable people with the name include:

Amadeusz Kłodawski (born 1987), Polish footballer
Amadeusz Skrzyniarz (born 1994), Polish footballer

Polish masculine given names